San Ramon (Spanish: San Ramón, meaning "St. Raymond") is a city in Contra Costa County, California, United States, located within the San Ramon Valley, and  east of San Francisco. San Ramon's population was 84,605 per the 2020 census, making it the 4th largest city in Contra Costa County, behind Richmond, Concord and Antioch.

San Ramon is home to the headquarters of Chevron Corporation, Cooper Companies, the West Coast headquarters of AT&T, GE Digital, as well as the San Ramon Medical Center. Major annual events include the Art and Wind Festival on Memorial Day weekend and the Run for Education in October.

On April 24, 2001, San Ramon was designated a Tree City USA.

History

The lands now occupied by the City of San Ramon were formerly inhabited by Seunen people, an Ohlone/Costanoan group who built their homes near creeks. Sometime around 1797, they were taken by Mission San José for use as grazing land. In 1834, they were part of the Rancho San Ramon land grant to José María Amador.

Amador named  not after a real saint but rather after a Native American vaquero who tended mission sheep on the land. Amador added the "San" per Spanish custom. In 1850, the first permanent American settlers, Leo and Mary Jane Norris, purchased the northwest corner of Amador's Rancho San Ramon, near the intersection of present-day Bollinger Canyon Road and Crow Canyon Road.

The tracks for the San Ramon Branch Line of the Southern Pacific Railroad were laid down and completed in 1891. The line extended from San Ramon to an unincorporated area known as Avon, east of Martinez, where it connected to the Oakland/Stockton Line. On February 7, 1909, Southern Pacific extended the line south to Radum (near Pleasanton). In 1934, passenger service ended. By 1986, Contra Costa County had obtained the railroad right-of-way and the Iron Horse Regional Trail was established along its path.

Geography

Mount Diablo flanks the city to the northeast and is prominently visible from almost all parts of the city. The Las Trampas Regional Wilderness borders San Ramon's extreme northwest, at the northern end of Bollinger Canyon. The smaller Bishop Ranch Regional Preserve straddles San Ramon's western border, located approximately between Interstate 680 and the Alameda County line.

The topography of San Ramon is varied, featuring a mix of the rolling hills of the Diablo Range and the flatter basin of the San Ramon Valley. The city is predominantly urban and residential with many new housing developments; however, much of the land around the city's perimeter regions remains undeveloped, and is covered by grasslands and oak tree orchards. During the drier months the grasses are golden, but with the precipitation of winter and spring, the grasses turn green.

Climate
San Ramon's weather typifies a Mediterranean climate, seasonal, and moderate. Summers can range from warm to hot and dry, while winters are mild or cool, wet and rather short. Its weather is similar to the adjacent cities of Danville, Dublin and Pleasanton. Fog can be infrequent but occurs normally in the western reaches of the city, at the eastern mouth of Crow Canyon, through which marine weather patterns funnel in from the San Francisco Bay via Castro Valley. It usually burns off by mid-to-late morning.

Demographics

2010 census
The 2010 United States Census reported that San Ramon had a population of 72,148. The racial makeup of San Ramon was 38,639 (53.6%) White, 2,043 (2.8%) African American, 205 (0.3%) Native American, 25,713 (35.6%) Asian, 156 (0.2%) Pacific Islander, 1,536 (2.1%) from other races, and 3,856 (5.3%) from two or more races. Hispanic or Latino of any race were 6,250 persons (8.7%).

The Census reported that 72,073 people (99.9% of the population) lived in households, 52 (0.1%) lived in non-institutionalized group quarters, and 23 (0%) were institutionalized.

There were 25,284 households, out of which 11,988 (47.4%) had children under the age of 18 living in them, 16,318 (64.5%) were opposite-sex married couples living together, 1,997 (7.9%) had a female householder with no husband present, 850 (3.4%) had a male householder with no wife present. There were 1,067 (4.2%) unmarried opposite-sex partnerships, and 187 (0.7%) same-sex married couples or partnerships. 4,682 households (18.5%) were made up of individuals, and 1,105 (4.4%) had someone living alone who was 65 years of age or older. The average household size was 2.85. There were 19,165 families (75.8% of all households); the average family size was 3.30.

The population was spread out, with 21,351 people (29.6%) under the age of 18, 3,557 people (4.9%) aged 18 to 24, 22,798 people (31.6%) aged 25 to 44, 18,815 people (26.1%) aged 45 to 64, and 5,627 people (7.8%) who were 65 years of age or older.  The median age was 37.1 years. For every 100 females, there were 96.6 males.  For every 100 females age 18 and over, there were 92.4 males.

The homeowner vacancy rate was 1.3%; the rental vacancy rate was 4.0%.  54,705 people (75.8% of the population) lived in owner-occupied housing units and 17,368 people (24.1%) lived in rental housing units.

The median income for a household in the city was $119,297, and the median income for a family was $132,339. Males had a median income of $97,475 versus $70,083 for females. The per capita income for the city was $50,736. About 2.0% of families and 2.8% of the population were below the poverty line, including 2.9% of those under age 18 and 3.5% of those age 65 or over.

2000 census

As of the census of 2000, there were 44,722 people, 16,944 households, and 12,148 families residing in the city.  The population density was 1,491.1/km2 (3,862.0/mi2).  There were 17,552 housing units at an average density of 585.2/km2 (1,515.7/mi2).  The racial makeup of the city was 36.82% White, 1.93% Black or African American, 0.36% Native American, 50.94% Asian, 0.21% Pacific Islander, 2.16% from other races, and 3.58% from two or more races.  7.24% of the population were Hispanic or Latino of any race.

There were 16,944 households, out of which 37.9% had children under the age of 18 living with them, 61.8% were married couples living together, 7.0% had a female householder with no husband present, and 28.3% were non-families. 21.1% of all households were made up of individuals, and 3.6% had someone living alone who was 65 years of age or older.  The average household size was 2.63 and the average family size was 3.12.

In the city, the population was spread out, with 26.3% under the age of 18, 5.8% from 18 to 24, 35.7% from 25 to 44, 26.2% from 45 to 64, and 6.1% who were 65 years of age or older.  The median age was 36 years. For every 100 females, there were 97.3 males.  For every 100 females age 18 and over, there were 94.6 males.

The median income for a household in the city was $95,856, and the median income for a family was $106,321. Males had a median income of $73,502 versus $50,107 for females. The per capita income for the city was $42,336.  About 1.4% of families and 2.0% of the population were below the poverty line, including 1.4% of those under age 18 and 4.5% of those age 65 or over.

Economy

Bishop Ranch, a master-planned office park development, with some retail elements, began major construction in the early 1980s, and provides a healthy tax base for the city. Bishop Ranch is situated on 585 acres once owned by Western Electric, and was farmland before that. Current tenants include the corporate headquarters of Chevron Corporation (formerly ChevronTexaco), as well the West Coast headquarters of AT&T Inc. (which had been the headquarters of Pacific Bell from about 1983, when it relocated from downtown San Francisco, until the merger with SBC Communications that created the current AT&T). United Parcel Service has a regional distribution center in Bishop Ranch. Toyota has a regional office and parts distribution center located there. GE Global Research started its Global Software Center in Bishop Ranch in 2011. Bishop Ranch covers the vast majority of "Central San Ramon", which is the large square formed by Freeway 680 on the west, Crow Canyon Road on the north, Iron Horse trail on the east, and Bollinger Canyon Road on the south (though several complexes are south of Bollinger).  In December 2016, the Ligier EZ-10 began use in the first autonomous vehicle passenger shuttle route in North America, looping through Bishop Ranch Office Park, with on-sight operation and maintenance by First Transit.

ChevronTexaco's headquarters moved from San Francisco to San Ramon in 2001  but 12 years later, 800 jobs were moved to Houston, a quarter of the San Ramon workforce due to high corporate costs and to consolidate existing units in Houston.

According to USA Today in 2020, San Ramon was not only the wealthiest city in California, but also in the entire United States.

Largest employers
According to the city's 2020 Comprehensive Annual Financial Report, the top employers in the city are:

Downtown
In 2014, the city approved the project's design that called for an animated civic space featuring . The City Center has a variety of shops, including furniture, clothing, food, and an indoor movie theater. The city center was designed by international architectural firm Renzo Piano Building Workshop. The grand opening was on November 8, 2018.

Arts and culture

The San Ramon Library and Dougherty Station Library branches of the Contra Costa County Library and Ramona Library are in San Ramon.

Forest Home Farms in San Ramon is listed on the National Register of Historic Places.

Parks and recreation
San Ramon features 58 separate parks and an 18-hole gold course, the San Ramon Golf Club.

Memorial Park

Originally, this city park, located on a hill overlooking Bollinger Canyon Road and San Ramon Valley Blvd., was to be named Alta Mesa Park. During the construction of the park, the City Council voted to change the name to Memorial Park to honor Tom Burnett, a San Ramon resident, and other victims from Flight 93 killed in the September 11 attacks of 2001. A plaque was installed at the base of a lighted flagpole dedicated to those victims and the surrounding meadow is part of the city's memorial tree program dedicated to local residents who have perished. The park was dedicated on September 11, 2002.

This 16-acre park includes a play area, a BMX course, a picnic area, a bocce ball court, horseshoe courts, a ball field, a dog park, rest rooms and water fountains (including a doggy water fountain). The play area has two big play structures, one for ages 2–5 and another for ages 5–12.

Government
San Ramon is governed by a five-body City Council composed of individuals elected to four-year overlapping terms in coordination with a two-year elected mayor. Police services were provided under contract by the Contra Costa County Sheriff's Department until July 1, 2007, when the city officially took over providing police services. The city of San Ramon is in Contra Costa County.

As of 2020, the elected representatives are Dave Hudson (Mayor), Scott Perkins (Vice Mayor), Mark Armstrong, Sridhar Verose, and Sabina Zafar (Council members).

In the United States House of Representatives, the city is fully within the Contra Costa-based 10th Congressional District, represented by Democrat Mark DeSaulnier. 

According to the California Secretary of State, as of February 10, 2019, San Ramon has 41,872 registered voters. Of those, 16,518 (39.4%) are registered Democrats, 8,907 (21.3%) are registered Republicans, and 12,147 (29%) have declined to state a political party.

Education
San Ramon's public schools are part of the San Ramon Valley Unified School District (SRVUSD), serving approximately 32,000 students. The city has 12 elementary schools and four middle schools. The high schools are California High School and Dougherty Valley High School. An alternative K–12 school is operated by the SRVUSD to support home-schooled students: Venture Independent Study School, along with Del Amigo High School which offers credit recovery courses on a flexible schedule.  The district has two additional high schools outside San Ramon, including Monte Vista, and San Ramon Valley.

California High School was founded in 1973 and ranked 1049th best high school in the United States by Newsweek. Dougherty Valley High School was founded in 2007 and is ranked 42nd within California; it is ranked No. 158 in the national rankings and earned a gold medal.

Higher education
 Diablo Valley College – San Ramon branch campus
 University of San Francisco – San Ramon regional campus
 UC Davis Graduate School of Management – the Bay Area working professional program

Transportation

Bus and rail 
Local bus service in the San Ramon Valley is provided primarily by County Connection (Central Contra Costa Transit Authority, or CCCTA).

Roads 
The major freeway in the area is Interstate 680. No US highways or California state highways run through San Ramon.

Air 
San Ramon is located halfway between Buchanan Field Airport and Livermore Municipal Airport, though Buchanan Field only flies to destinations in Greater Los Angeles, and Livermore has no regularly scheduled commercial service. The closest airport with regularly-scheduled commercial service to domestic and international destinations is Oakland International Airport, though San Francisco International Airport handles the majority of international traffic to San Ramon and the rest of the Bay Area.

Notable people

See also

 List of cities and towns in California
 List of cities and towns in the San Francisco Bay Area

References

External links

Chamber of Commerce

 
1983 establishments in California
Cities in Contra Costa County, California
Cities in the San Francisco Bay Area
Incorporated cities and towns in California
Populated places established in 1983